Martin Seeto (born 1962) is a former Papua New Guinea international lawn bowler.

Bowls career
Seeto has represented Papua New Guinea at two Commonwealth Games; in the pairs at the 1998 Commonwealth Games and in the fours at the 1990 Commonwealth Games.

He won a bronze medal with Albert Barakeina in the pairs at the 1995 Asia Pacific Bowls Championships, in Dunedin.

References

1962 births
Living people
Bowls players at the 1998 Commonwealth Games
Bowls players at the 1990 Commonwealth Games
Papua New Guinean male bowls players